Nummi (Finnish; Nummisbacken in Swedish) is a district and a suburb of the city of Turku, Finland. It is located in the north-eastern part of the city, just outside the city centre and south of the river Aura. It is the fourth largest district in Turku, having a population of 7,011, with an annual growth rate of 2.21%.

10.03% of the district's population are under 15 years old, while 8.17% are over 65. The district's linguistic makeup is 87.98% Finnish, 5.65% Swedish, and 6.38% other.

Nummi  is  one  of  the  oldest  suburbs  of  Turku.  In  addition  to  the  area  of  Nummi  proper  (sometimes  called   Nummenpakka  in  the     local  dialect),  the  district  incorporates  the  former  villages  of  Hannunniittu  and  Kuuvuori,  as  well  as  the  Turku Student Village, the  largest  student  housing  complex  in  Finland.

See also
 Districts of Turku
 Districts of Turku by population

References

Districts of Turku